"All Me" is a song by Canadian rapper Drake from his third studio album Nothing Was the Same (2013). The song was serviced to urban contemporary radio as the album's third official single on September 24, 2013. "All Me" features fellow rappers 2 Chainz and Big Sean, with production from Finally Famous' Key Wane and Noah "40" Shebib. This song peaked at number 20 on the US Billboard Hot 100 chart.

Background 
On August 1, 2013, Drake released "All Me" featuring Big Sean and 2 Chainz, with production from Key Wane. The song also featured an intro by comedian Aziz Ansari. Key Wane gave Drake and Noah "40" Shebib credit for adding the Ansari sample and the ending breakdown. However, the intro and ending of the song are not included on the album. The Ansari intro features a sample of one of Ansari's alter egos, "Randy", from the movie Funny People.

Key Wane originally played the instrumental backing track used for "All Me" through his iPad at a photoshoot for Sean's clothing line. Sean took interest in the beat and decided to use it for his upcoming album Hall of Fame. However, the song would go unfinished for several months. After a period without progress on the track, Wane tweaked it and sent the song to Drake, who was coincidentally in the studio with 2 Chainz. Drake and 2 Chainz immediately became interested in the song and recorded verses over the instrumental. While spending time at Drake's Los Angeles home, Sean discovered that they both had recorded verses over the track. Key Wane then pressured Sean to send Drake his verse so he could use the song on his album, Nothing Was the Same.

Release and promotion 
On August 1, 2013, Drake released "All Me" for free download via his SoundCloud account. However, as Nothing Was the Sames September 24 release was approaching, it was removed from SoundCloud. The song was originally reported to be Nothing Was the Sames second single, before "Hold On, We're Going Home" 's release.

The song would be released to DJs as a promotional single that same month. Then on September 24, 2013, Drake serviced "All Me" to urban contemporary radio in the United States as Nothing Was the Same's third official single.

Critical reception 
"All Me" was met with rave reviews upon its release, including praise from Spin, Fuse and Vice, among others. Acclaim was mainly directed at the verses, and the production. DJBooth.net, Paste and The Fader called the song a summer anthem. Although he praised  Nothing Was the Same overall, Jesal 'Jay Soul' Padania of Rapreviews.com said that the deluxe edition tracks, including "All Me", were stronger than most of other tracks appearing on the standard version of the album.

Jon Blistein of Rolling Stone praised the song, stating that "Drake emphasizes his self-made come up and bank account size over a gorgeous bed of subdued synths; when it drops after the hook, it's into hollow bell rings, a warped monastic vocal sample and a characteristically ridiculous 2 Chainz verse." Complex praised Big Sean's appearance as the thirteenth best verse of 2013.

Live performances 
In August 2013, Drake performed "All Me" at Kylie Jenner's Sweet 16, in a medley of other songs including "Started From the Bottom", "HYFR", and "No New Friends". Drake performed the song as a part of his regular set list, throughout the Would You like a Tour? concert tour. On December 16, 2013, during the tour's stop in Detroit, Big Sean made a surprise appearance and performed the song with Drake.

Chart performance

Weekly charts

Year-end charts

Certifications

Release history

References 

2013 singles
Drake (musician) songs
Big Sean songs
2 Chainz songs
Songs written by Drake (musician)
Songs written by 2 Chainz
Songs written by Big Sean
Song recordings produced by Key Wane
Song recordings produced by 40 (record producer)
2013 songs
Cash Money Records singles
Republic Records singles
Songs written by Key Wane
Songs written by Anthony Palman
Trap music songs